Skeletons is the second studio album by American metalcore band Sirens and Sailors. The album was released on October 29, 2013 through Artery Recordings and Razor & Tie.

Track listing

Personnel
Credits by Allmusic
Sirens and Sailors
 Kyle Bihrle – lead vocals
 Doug Court – drums
 Todd Golder – rhythm guitar, clean vocals
 Jimm Lindsley – lead guitar
 Steven Goupil – bass

Production
 Sirens and Sailors – Producer
 Grant McFarland – Engineer, mixing, cello
 Carson Slovak – Engineer, mixing
 Troy Glessner – Mastering
 Taylor Brandt – Violin
 Cory Hadje – Management
 Ben Leubitz – Management
 Mike Milford – A&R
 Josiah Moore – Art Direction, design

References

2013 albums
Sirens and Sailors albums